Lotoko is a community on the Busira River in the Province of Équateur in the Democratic Republic of the Congo. In the colonial period it held a trading post.

Location

It is in Ingende Territory. 

Colonial era

Lotoko was a post of the Société anonyme belge pour le commerce du Haut-Congo (SAB) in the Mbala–Londji territory, near the villages of the Lingoy chiefdom.
"Lotoko" is the name of a group of Mongo people.
The trading posts and missions were often given the same name as the local people.

The Belgians were brutal in collecting rubber. 
An account by a local person of SAB activities in collecting rubber (caoutchouc or CTC) says,

Notes

Sources

Populated places in the province of Équateur